Henry II of Champagne (or Henry I of Jerusalem) (29 July 1166 – 10 September 1197) was count of Champagne from 1181 to 1197, and king of Jerusalem from 1192 to 1197 by virtue of his marriage to Queen Isabella I of Jerusalem.

Early life
Henry was the elder son of Count Henry I of Champagne and Marie, daughter of King Louis VII of France and Duchess Eleanor of Aquitaine. His aunt Adela of Champagne was Louis VII's third wife. In 1171, Henry was betrothed to Isabella of Hainault. When she married Philip II of France instead, his father, aunt and other members of his family were angered. It made Queen Adela's faction hostile to Isabella's family and so caused tension at the French court. Henry's father died in 1181, and his mother ruled, as regent, until 1187.

Crusade 

In 1190 Henry left for the East, after having his barons swear to recognize his younger brother Theobald as his successor should he fail to return. He joined the Third Crusade, arriving ahead of his uncles, Kings Philip II of France and Richard I of England. Initially, he was one of the leaders of the French contingent at the siege of Acre before Philip's arrival. He is said to have been a member of the group involved in the abduction of Queen Isabella I of Jerusalem, to get her to consent to a divorce from Humphrey IV of Toron so that she could be married to Conrad of Montferrat. Henry was related to Conrad through both his maternal grandparents. According to Baha ad-Din ibn Shaddad, he was wounded at Acre on 15 November.

Later on in the campaign, Henry shifted his allegiance to Richard who, in April 1192, sent Henry as his representative from Acre to Tyre, to inform Conrad of Montferrat of his election as king of Jerusalem. Henry then returned to Acre. A few days later, Conrad was murdered by two Assassins. Henry came back to Tyre two days later, ostensibly to help organise Conrad's coronation, but found that a funeral was being prepared instead. He was immediately betrothed to the newly widowed—and pregnant—queen of Jerusalem. They were married just eight days after Conrad's death.

The marriage was glossed romantically by some of the chroniclers: that Isabella was so taken with Henry's physical attractions (he was 20 years younger than Conrad) that she asked him to marry her. Since she was already known to be pregnant with Conrad's child, Maria of Montferrat, the marriage was considered scandalous by some, but it was politically vital for her to acquire another husband to defend the kingdom. However, some consultation with the High Court might have been expected. The couple went on to have two daughters, Alice and Philippa.

Henry asked for permission from his uncle Richard, who gave it promptly: however, since Richard was suspected of Conrad's murder, this raises further questions about the whole episode. Indeed, Henry, who was known to the Arabs as "al-kond Herri", later sought an alliance with the Hashshashin, and was invited to visit their fortress stronghold, al-Kahf. To demonstrate his authority, the grand master of the Hashshashin beckoned to two adherents, who immediately flung themselves from the ramparts to their deaths. The Hashshashin then offered to commit a murder for Henry, as an honour to their guest. Henry demurred, concluded the treaty, and departed. Patrick A. Williams has suggested Henry himself as a suspect in Conrad's murder, although it would have been a risky undertaking without his uncle's support.

Henry died in 1197, falling from a window, one floor off the ground, at his palace in Acre. There are varying accounts in different manuscripts of the Old French Continuation of William of Tyre, also known as The Chronicle of Ernoul. The majority suggest that a window-lattice or balcony gave way as he leaned against it. A servant, possibly a dwarf named Scarlet, also fell, after trying to save him by catching hold of his hanging sleeve - he weighed too little to pull the king (who was tall and strongly built) back. Another version suggests that Henry had been watching a parade from the window, when a party of Pisan envoys entered the room. Turning to greet them, he stepped backwards and overbalanced. Whatever the exact circumstances, Henry was killed outright; the servant, who suffered a fractured femur, raised the alarm, but later died of his injury. Some accounts suggest that Henry might have survived if his servant had not landed on top of him.

Legacy 

His widow Queen Isabella remarried soon after his death. Her fourth (and last) husband was Aimery of Lusignan, king of Cyprus. Henry's heir-general was his elder daughter Alice who was soon married to her stepbrother King Hugh I of Cyprus and whose heirs represent the senior line of counts of Champagne.

Henry left behind several difficulties for Champagne. He had borrowed a great deal of money to finance his expedition to Jerusalem, and for his marriage; and the succession to the county of Champagne would later be contested by his daughters. In 1213, supporters of his nephew Theobald IV of Champagne alleged to a papal legate that the annulment of Isabella's marriage to Humphrey of Toron (who was still alive during her marriage to Henry) was invalid, and therefore the girls were illegitimate. However, this was questionable: the legitimacy of Isabella's daughter by Conrad, Maria, and the right of her descendants to the throne of Jerusalem was never challenged, and if Maria was legitimate, so too were Isabella's daughters by Henry. Theobald eventually had to buy off both Alice and Philippa at considerable cost.

Genealogical table

Notes

Sources

 
 
 Runciman, Steven. (1951), A History of the Crusades, Volume Three:  The Kingdom of Acre and the Later Crusades, Cambridge University Press, London
 Williams, Patrick A. "The Assassination of Conrad of Montferrat: Another Suspect?", Traditio, vol. XXVI, 1970.

1166 births
1197 deaths
12th-century kings of Jerusalem
Accidental deaths from falls
Counts of Champagne
Kings of Jerusalem
Jure uxoris kings
House of Blois
Christians of the Third Crusade